The 1976 American Airlines Tennis Games was a tennis tournament played on outdoor hard courts. It was the third edition of the Indian Wells Masters and was an ATP sanctioned tournament but was not part of the WCT or Grand Prix seasons. It was played at the Mission Hills Country Club in Rancho Mirage, California in the United States and ran from March 22 through March 28, 1976. First-seeded Jimmy Connors won the singles title.

Finals

Singles

 Jimmy Connors defeated  Roscoe Tanner 6–4, 6–4
 It was Connors' 4th singles title of the year and the 45th of his career.

Doubles

 Colin Dibley /  Sandy Mayer defeated  Raymond Moore /  Erik van Dillen 6–4, 6–7, 7–6
 It was Dibley's 1st title of the year and the 9th of his career. It was Mayer's 2nd title of the year and the 9th of his career.

References

External links
 
 ITF tournament edition details

 
1976 American Airlines Tennis Games
American Airlines Tennis Games
American Airlines Tennis Games
American Airlines Tennis Games